Blue Swords is an international figure skating competition organized by the Deutsche Eislauf-Union. It is usually held in Chemnitz, Saxony, Germany. Medals are awarded in the disciplines of men's singles, ladies' singles, pair skating, and ice dancing. Champions of the event win the "Blue Swords Trophy".

History 
Blue Swords began as a senior international competition in East Germany, and was held annually between 1961 and 1998. In 1985, it became a junior-level event. Since 1997, it is chosen in some years by the International Skating Union to be part of the ISU Junior Grand Prix circuit. These are the only years when the event is still held.

The German name for the event is "Pokal der Blauen Schwerter", referring to the blue swords trademark of Meissen porcelain. The Blue Sword Trophy is made of that porcelain.

Senior medalists

Men

Ladies

Pair skating

Ice dancing

Junior medalists

Men

Ladies

Pairs

Ice dancing

References

External links 

 Eislauf Union (German Skating Union) 

 
Figure skating competitions
Figure skating in East Germany